Mark Jonathon George Mason (born 12 September 1975) is a former English cricketer.  Mason was a right-handed batsman who bowls right-arm fast-medium.  He was born at Leicester, Leicestershire.

Mason made his debut for Cambridgeshire in a List A match, which came against Hertfordshire.  From 2000 to 2003, he represented the county in 5 List-A matches, with his final List-A match coming against Yorkshire.  In his 5 matches, he took 6 wickets at a bowling average of 25.66, with best figures of 2/34.

Mason also represented Cambridgeshire in the Minor Counties Championship, where he made his debut for the county in that competition against Suffolk.  From 2000 to 2003, he represented the county in 16 Minor Counties matches, with his final appearance for the county coming against Buckinghamshire.

References

External links
Mark Mason at Cricinfo
Mark Mason at CricketArchive

1975 births
Living people
Cricketers from Leicester
English cricketers
Cambridgeshire cricketers